James J. Maher, C.M. (born in Maywood, New Jersey), is an American Catholic priest and academic administrator. He is Niagara University's 26th president since being named such on August 1, 2013. He succeeded Joseph L. Levesque.

Education 
In 1984, Maher received a Bachelor of Arts in Sociology from St. John's University. In 1989 he obtained a Master of Divinity and in 1990 a Master of Theology from Mary Immaculate Seminary, followed by a Doctor of Ministry (D.Min.) from the Immaculate Conception Seminary School of Theology in 2004.

Career 
Maher pronounced his vows to the Vincentian community in May 1989 and was ordained to the priesthood on May 26, 1990.

Since then, he has been Campus Minister (1994–1999), Vice President for University Ministry (1999-2005), Vice President for Student Affairs (2004-2010), Executive Director of the Vincentian Institute for Social Action (2009-2010) and Executive Vice President for Mission and Student Services (2011-2013) at St. John's University.

References

20th-century American Roman Catholic priests
Living people
Mary Immaculate Seminary alumni
People from Maywood, New Jersey
Presidents of Niagara University
St. John's University (New York City) alumni
Vincentians
Catholics from New Jersey
Year of birth missing (living people)
21st-century American Roman Catholic priests